The Eldorado City Hall, located at 1604 Locust St., is the former city hall of Eldorado, Illinois. Built in 1924, the building was Eldorado's first city hall; prior to its construction, the city government had been operated from the mayors' businesses. The architectural firm of Harry E. Boyle and Co. designed the building in the Classical Revival style. The brick building features a second-story entrance, brick quoins at each corner, a large dormer with a semicircular window on the front facade, and soffit ends supported by wooden brackets below the dormer. In addition to serving as the city hall, the building housed Eldorado's fire department, jail, and public library. The city continued to use the building until 1994, when a new building was constructed; the old city hall is now a local history museum.

The building was added to the National Register of Historic Places on November 7, 1995.

References

City and town halls on the National Register of Historic Places in Illinois
Neoclassical architecture in Illinois
Government buildings completed in 1924
Buildings and structures in Saline County, Illinois
National Register of Historic Places in Saline County, Illinois
1924 establishments in Illinois
City and town halls in Illinois